Lakanica is type of supernatural being from traditional Polish folklore who is a spirit of the fields or meadows. These are reputed to be shy and elusive creatures who can appear in human female form. 

Scholar Alanna Muniz notes the range of such creatures in stories from western Slavic cultures that share a common non-hierarchical religion. A Lakanica was similar to other types ovily/rusalki, spirits who “are believed to reside in or near lakes, springs, rivers, and marshes, although they are also connected to fields, trees, and woods in some locations.”
A Lakanica and other mythological characters play a role in the 21st century novel The Dollmaker of Kraków, set before and during World War II.

References

Slavic legendary creatures